Montessori dei San Lorenzo (also known as MDSL) is a private, non-sectarian, school located in M.B Villar Ave., South 1, Springville, Molino, Bacoor, Cavite.

It was founded by Mrs. Loreli T. Martinez. This school now follows the K-12 curriculum which was recently applied by the Department of Education.

It has multiple activities applied to the school including: Camping, Field Trips and Club Tournaments.

Because of the 2020 Corona Virus Pandemic, it was converted to Online Classes. The owner's both school, ABBEY and MDSL merged a little bit for the use of Genyo E-Learning system, which is cheap and buggy. It also has Multiple Events like English Week which corresponds to the months events like Valentines Day. 

Montessori schools in the Philippines
Schools in Bacoor
High schools in Cavite
Elementary schools in the Philippines
2001 establishments in the Philippines
Educational institutions established in 2001